The Belfast and Northern Counties Railway (BNCR) Class A was a class of 13 two-cylinder compound steam locomotives built for service in north-east Ireland.  The first two members of the class would be the last locomotives to be built for the independent BNCR, being completed before its purchase by the Midland Railway in 1903.  The members of the class were rebuilt by the LMS (NCC) becoming either Class A1 or Class U2 depending on how they had been modified.

History 

The BNCR had standardised on locomotives with a 2-4-0 wheel arrangement for its passenger locomotives during the 1870s and construction continued through to the mid-1890s.  However, with increasing loads and heavier trains the limitations of this wheel arrangement became apparent.  The first purpose-built 4-4-0s, the Class B "Light Compounds", had been in introduced in 1897 but something more powerful was needed to supplement the two Class D "Heavy Compounds" that were rebuilt to 4-4-0s at the same time.

The Class A locomotives were designed by the BNCR Locomotive Engineer Bowman Malcolm and were the last design of broad gauge locomotives to be built for the independent Belfast and Northern Counties Railway, the first two being completed before its purchase by the Midland Railway in 1903.

The first Class A Engine was No.34 which was outshopped from York Road in April 1901 and named Queen Alexandra.  The second of the class, which had the distinction of being the last locomotive to be built by the BNCR, was No.3, King Edward VII, which was completed fifteen months later in July 1902.  Building continued over a seven-year period after the take-over of the company by the Midland Railway.  Six locomotives were constructed at the Midland Railway's Derby Works and the remainder at York Road works.

Inside Walschaerts valve gear was fitted which was standard on the BNCR. The driving wheels were of  diameter. The only visible difference between the two builders was the number of spokes on the bogie wheels, the Belfast-built batch had nine spokes while those built at Derby had ten.

Two main, and visibly obvious, changes were made to the locomotives when in traffic, viz: the fitting of Manson automatic tablet exchange apparatus for working single lines, and a rearwards projecting extension of the cab roof, offering more protection for the crew.

Five members of the class were renumbered between 1924 and 1927 when Nos. 3, 4, 5, 9 and 17 became Nos.  33, 62, 59, 69 and 58 respectively.

Rebuilding 
Following the end of World War I the state of the locomotives operating in Northern Ireland was well below that which was needed to run the services effectively; much needed replacing but, however, cost was a major factor. It was decided to implement a "Renewal Programme" in which, not only new locomotives would be built but suitable classes of locomotives would be rebuilt, in the main following the style of the Midland and LMS railways. As part of this "Renewal Programme" all members of Class A were rebuilt between 1928 and 1936.

Dependent upon the modifications carried out, they were reclassified as either Class A1 or Class U2.  Those classified as Class A1 were rebuilt with a Midland Railway type RG6 boiler and new cylinders of  diameter x stroke and retained some recognisable features.  Those that were rebuilt as Class U2 underwent a more radical alteration and may have incorporated little of the original engines.

Details of the delivery, renumbering and rebuilding of the class are shown in the table below:

 * The name Queen Alexandra was transferred from No.34 to No.63 in November 1932.
  Locomotives 34 and 3 were built by the BNCR prior to being taken over by the Midland Railway in 1903.
  The name Lurigethan was allocated, but never carried.

Livery 
The BNCR painted the locomotives "invisible green" (a very dark bronze green that looked almost black) with vermilion, light blue and yellow lining.  The initials "BNCR" in block capitals were carried on the tender sides.

The livery remained the same under Midland Railway administration with the addition of the diamond shaped Midland Railway crest to the cab sides and the initials "NCC" in gold block capitals on the tender sides.  Buffer beams were vermilion, and the smoke box was black.

References 
 
 
 

A
Steam locomotives of Northern Ireland
4-4-0 locomotives
Steam locomotives of Ireland
Compound locomotives
Railway locomotives introduced in 1901
Passenger locomotives
Scrapped locomotives
5 ft 3 in gauge locomotives